Enniatins are a class of organic chemical compounds found in Fusarium fungi.  They appear in nature as mixtures of cyclic depsipeptides.  The main variants are enniatin A, A1, B and B1 together with minor amounts of enniatin C, D, E and F.

The enniatins act as ionophores that bind ammonium, and they have been proposed as replacements for nonactin in specific ammonium-based electrodes.

Enniatins have been also mentioned as potential anti-AIDS drugs.

See also
 Beauvericin
 Fusafungine

Biosynthesis

Chemical properties

References 

Depsipeptides
Ionophores